Takashi Nagao (born 31 August 1957) is a Japanese former track and field athlete who competed in the 400 metres hurdles. He was the gold medallist at the 1982 Asian Games and the 1981 Asian Athletics Championships, as well as runner-up at those tournaments in 1978 and 1979.

A three-time national champion at the Japan Championships in Athletics, his personal best for the 400 m hurdles was 49.59 seconds. He also twice represented Asia at the IAAF World Cup.

Career

Nagao established himself among the top Asian hurdlers in the 1977 season. At the Japan Championships in Athletics that year he won the 400 m hurdles title in a time of 51.11 seconds – the best ever recorded by a Japanese athlete at the competition. He was unable to compete at the 1977 Asian Athletics Championships, as the even was cancelled due to the lack of support from the International Amateur Athletics Federation, following the exclusion of Israel from the tournament. Nagao competed at two major international events that year: he was Asia's selection for the 1977 IAAF World Cup, placing eighth, and was a bronze medallist at the 1977 Pacific Conference Games, finishing behind Australian Garry Brown and Sam Turner of the United States.

Nagao defended his national title in 1978 and was thus selected to represent Japan at the 1978 Asian Games. He reached the final and finished in a time of 50.98 seconds, taking runner-up spot behind Iraqi hurdler Hussein Kadhum. He teamed up for the 4×400 metres relay with sprinters Eiji Natori, Yasuhiro Harada and long jumper Junichi Usui and anchored the quartet to a gold medal, narrowly holding off India's 800 m Asian Games champion Sri Ram Singh. Nagao ran a lifetime best of 49.59 seconds in Tokyo in September that year – a time which placed him eleventh on the global seasonal rankings. He won a third consecutive national title in 1979, winning in a championship record of 51.09 seconds. He was a pick for the national team for the 1979 Asian Athletics Championships held in Tokyo. The Japanese duo of Nagao and Yukihiro Yoshimatsu reached the podium, with Kadhum retaining his position as the continent's best hurdler and Nagao again taking a silver medal. Yoshimatsu succeeded Nagao to the national title in 1980 (breaking his record as well).

Shigenori Ohmori was the new Japanese 400 m hurdles champion in 1981, but Nagao overhauled his national rival at the 1979 Asian Athletics Championships, running 50.32 seconds to top the podium in a championship record time. Ohmori and Yoshimatsu rounded out the podium to make it a Japanese medal sweep at the championships in Tokyo. Nagao was the first Japanese male athlete to win the championship title. Replacing Kadhum as the region's top hurdler, he was chosen for both the 400 m hurdles and the 4 × 400 m relay team for Asia at the 1981 IAAF World Cup.

Nagao failed to win the national championships in 1982, as Ohmori led the field for a second year running. However, Nagao maintained his dominance at continental level with a gold medal at the Asian Games in New Delhi. The final was a battle between the two Japanese and Nagao came out on top for a second Asian title, breaking the Asian Games record in the process with his effort of 50.60 seconds. In contrast to his unique Asian Championships win, Nagao's Asian Games title added to a long tradition of Japanese success in the 400 m hurdles, as he became the nation's fifth man to claim the gold. This proved to be the last major medal of his career and after the age of twenty-five he never managed to win another national title either.

National titles
Japan Championships in Athletics
110 m hurdles: 1977, 1978, 1979

International competitions

References

Living people
1957 births
Place of birth missing (living people)
Japanese male hurdlers
Athletes (track and field) at the 1978 Asian Games
Athletes (track and field) at the 1982 Asian Games
Asian Games medalists in athletics (track and field)
Asian Games gold medalists for Japan
Asian Games silver medalists for Japan
Medalists at the 1978 Asian Games
Medalists at the 1982 Asian Games
Japan Championships in Athletics winners